Bonobos is an upscale, e-commerce-driven apparel subsidiary of Walmart headquartered in New York City that designs and sells menswear, including suits, trousers, denim, shirts, shorts, swimwear, outerwear, and accessories. The company was founded by Stanford Business School students Andy Dunn and Brian Spaly and launched as an online retailer in 2007.

In 2012, Bonobos diversified to incorporate physical retail locations with the launch of their  "Guideshop" locations  and through a partnership with Nordstrom.

History

Early history 
Bonobos was founded by Brian Spaly, who began designing men's pants at Stanford Business School that featured a curved waistband, medium rise, and tailored thigh that fit better than khakis and eliminated "khaki diaper butt." As demand grew, he and housemate Andy Dunn pursued the project as a business opportunity.

Initially, the brand was launched exclusively online. Dunn cashed in his 401(k) to build bonobos.com and raised a round of angel investment. Initial investors included Wealthfront CEO and former venture capitalist Andy Rachleff and JetBlue chairman and founding Bonobos board member Joel Peterson, both of whom had lectured Dunn at Stanford Business School. Dunn then moved to New York with 400 pairs of pants that he picked, packed, and shipped from his Union Square apartment.

Within six months, the firm grew to five employees and a  net revenue run rate. In 2009, Spaly moved on to another venture, running the Chicago-based fashion commerce company Trunk Club.

In 2010, the company received its first institutionally-driven financing round, raising  from Accel Partners and Lightspeed Venture Partners. As part of the round, Accel Partners's Sameer Gandhi and Lightspeed Venture Partners's Jeremy Liew joined Bonobos's board.

As Bonobos expanded its assortment to include suits, dress shirts, outerwear, and tailored pieces, more customers requested the opportunity to "try before they buy".  In fall 2011, the company tested an e-commerce store at their New York headquarters, calling the location a "Guideshop". The purpose of the Guideshop location was to provide a physical space for customers to try on Bonobos prior to e-commerce transactions being placed. Within a year, the concept became an integral part of the firm's service and business model.

Company growth (2012-2017) 
In 2012, Bonobos closed a  strategic minority investment round led by Nordstrom, with participation from existing investors. In tandem, Bonobos partnered with Nordstrom to sell the brand’s clothing in their full-line stores and website. Bonobos furthered its offline reach in May 2012, opening its first standalone Guideshop location in Boston. By January 2013, Bonobos had opened additional Guideshop locations in Chicago, Georgetown, and San Francisco.

Bonobos announced a  round in 2013, with Glynn Capital and Mousse Partners joining existing investors Accel Partners, Lightspeed Venture Partners, Forerunner Ventures and Nordstrom. At this time, Forerunner's Managing Partner Kirsten Green joined the Bonobos board and total funding to date reached nearly $73 million. Simultaneously, the company launched the golf brand Maide, which is the second brand launched by the Bonobos team. By August 2013, Bonobos had opened Guideshop locations on Crosby Street in New York; Bethesda, Maryland; Austin, Texas; and the luxury shopping enclave of Greenwich Avenue, in Greenwich, Connecticut,  bringing the total location count to nine. By August 2013 employee headcount reached 175. Dunn temporarily hired Francine Della Badia, the former head of Coach's North American retail division and Victoria´s Secret, to take his place in summer 2015. Three months later, she stepped down because "she felt she couldn’t change the company’s culture," and Dunn re-assumed the role.

Recent history (2017-) 
The brand would not be sold in the Walmart stores; instead it would be sold on Walmart's recently purchased Jet.com. Bonobos CEO Andy Dunn remained with the company after the purchase. He became Walmart's senior vice president of digital brands, which also included Allswell. Micky Onvural, who had joined Bonobos as CMO in 2015, became the new CEO.

Operations
Bonobos refers to its e-conmerce site's customer service representatives as Ninjas,  a term conceptualized by Dunn to attract college-educated qualified candidates to the job.

Technology 
In early 2012, Bonobos opened a West Coast office to build a Silicon Valley-based technology team in an effort to expand its nationwide retail presence. Following 18 months, the firm attempted to minimise inefficiencies by eliminating bi-coastal offices, which were then redundant; hence, in 2013, Bonobos relocated the technology arm to its New York headquarters.

References 

Walmart
Clothing retailers of the United States
American companies established in 2007
Clothing companies established in 2007
Retail companies established in 2007
Internet properties established in 2007